Ivan Misner is the founder and Chief Visionary Officer of the business networking organization BNI.

Career 
After starting his own consultancy business, Misner founded BNI in Arcadia, California in 1985 after losing an important client at his consultancy. The company expanded through a franchise-based business model.

Misner has written several books, including Truth or Delusion? Busting Networking's Biggest Myths and The 29% Solution: 52 Weekly Networking Success Strategies. He is also a columnist for Entrepreneur.com and Business Insider, and has appeared on television and radio shows on CNN, CNBC, the BBC and The Today Show on NBC.

Misner has taught business management and social capital courses. He is on the board of trustees for the University of La Verne.

Personal life 
Misner grew up in Covina, California, and graduated from Gladstone High School.

Publications 
Ivan Misner; Greg Davies; Julian Lewis. Infinite Giving.

; chapters 19 ("Premature Solicitation") and 24 ("Networking Faux Pas") by Misner.

References

External links 
Personal website

Year of birth missing (living people)
Living people
University of Southern California alumni
American business writers
People from Claremont, California
People from Austin, Texas